Maria Luisa Tisi (20 June, 1954 in São Paulo) better known as Lu Grimaldi, is a Brazilian actress, known for her work on Apocalipse (2017), Rock Story (2017), for her portrayal of Maria I of Portugal in Liberdade, Liberdade (2016) and Ambitious Women (2015).

Filmography

Television

References

1954 births
Living people
Actresses from São Paulo
Brazilian people of Italian descent